Maia is a Portuguese noble family with its origins in the 10th century.

Year 960 to 1129 
Lords of Maia before the creation of the Kingdom of Portugal
(965–         ) Trastamiro Aboazar – 1st Lord of Maia, son of Aboazar Lovesendes
(1000–1039)  Gonçalo Trastamires – 2nd Lord of Maia
(1020–1065)  Mendo Gonçalves da Maia – 3rd Lord of Maia
(1060–1103)  Dom Soeiro Mendes da Maia
(1094–1129)  Dom Paio Soares.

1129 to 1350
Lords of Maia
 (c. 1125–c.1170) Dom Pedro Paes da Maia
 (c. 1170–c. 1220) Dom Martinho Pires da Maia
 (c. 1220–1290) Fernão Martins da Maia
 (1270–1330) Monio Fernandes da Maia
 (c. 1300–1360) Martim Moniz da Maia

1350 to 1500
Lords of Trofa

 (c. 1350–1434) Martim da Maia. He was married to Ana Afonso de Lançós, daughter of Dona Florência Antónia de Lanços and Dom Richard of Teyve, who was son of Dom Richarte (French noble) grandson of Lord Richard of Cornwall, Earl of Cornwall and great-grandson of King John of England
 (c. 1380–1449) Álvaro Gonçalves da Maia
 (c. 1410–1476) Fernão Álvares da Maia
 (c. 1450–1500) João Gonçalves da Maia

1500 to 1690
Family in Guimarães
 (c. 1470–1520) Martim Vasques da Maia
 (1492–1548) Fernão Ferreira da Maia
 (1520–1580) D. Senhorinha Fernandes Ferreira da Maia
 (1540–1586) Manuel Álvares da Maia
 (1580–1640) D. Ana Manuel da Maia
 (c. 1600–1656) D. Francisca Dias Ferreira da Maia
 (1630–1690) D. Maria Ferreira da Maia
 (1670–1720) D. Ana Rodrigues Ferreira da Maia

Bibliology
D. António Caetano de Sousa, História Genealógica da Casa Real Portuguesa, Atlântida-Livraria Editora, Lda, 2ª Edição, Coimbra, 1946.
Fernandes, A. de Almeida (1960). A ação das linhagens no repovoamento. Porto: [s.n.]
Mattoso, José (1994). A Nobreza Medieval Portuguesa - A Família e o Poder. Lisboa: Editorial Estampa. 
Mattoso, José (1985). Identificação de um País. I. Lisboa: Editorial Estampa
Manuel José da Costa Felgueiras Gayo, Nobiliário das Famílias de Portugal, Carvalhos de Basto, 2ª Edição, Braga, 1989.
Sotto Mayor Pizarro, José Augusto (1997). Linhagens Medievais Portuguesas: Genealogias e Estratégias (1279-1325). I. Porto: Tese de Doutoramento, Edicão do Autor
Ventura, Leontina (1992). A nobreza de corte de Afonso III. II. Porto: Tese de Doutoramento, Edicão do Autor
Francisco Antônio Dória, A Semente, Edições Jardim da Casa.

References 

 José Augusto de Sotto Mayor Pizarro, Linhagens Medievais Portuguesas - 3 vols, Universidade Moderna, 1ª Edição, Porto, 1999. vol. 1-pg. 257.
 José João da Conceição Gonçalves Mattoso, A Nobreza Medieval Portuguesa, Imprensa Universitária-Editorial Estampa, 2ª Edição, Lisboa, 1987, pág. 219.
 Nobiliário de famílias de Portugal / Felgueiras Gaio. - [Braga] http://purl.pt/12151
 Francisco Antônio Dória, A Semente, Edições Jardim da Casa.

External links 
 A Boa Semente
 A Semente
 "Monarchia Luzitana"
 "Confirmação a Duarte de Lemos - 'Apresentou ainda a carta de doação a Gomes Martins, de juro e herdade, da terra da Trofa, por a perder Fernando Álvares da Maia, porquanto fora na batalha de Alfarrobeira com o Infante dom Pedro'"
"SENTENÇA DADA CONTRA ÁLVARO GONÇALVES DA MAIA, PELA QUAL SE JULGOU A GOMES MARTINS DE LEMOS AS TERRAS DA TROFA E CASTROVAIS"
 "Doação do Senhorio da Trofa a Gomes Martins de Lemos

Portuguese_noble_families